The 1984 Italian Open was a tennis tournament played on outdoor clay courts in Italy that was part of the 1984 Volvo Grand Prix and the 1984 Virginia Slims World Championship Series. The men's tournament was held in Rome while the women's tournament was held in Perugia from 21 May through 27 May 1984.

Finals

Men's singles
 Andrés Gómez defeated  Aaron Krickstein 2–6, 6–1, 6–2, 6–2

Women's singles
 Manuela Maleeva defeated  Chris Evert 6–3, 6–3

Men's doubles
 Ken Flach /  Robert Seguso defeated  John Alexander /  Mike Leach 3–6, 6–3, 6–4

Women's doubles
 Iva Budařová /  Helena Suková defeated  Kathleen Horvath /  Virginia Ruzici 7–6(7–5), 1–6, 6–4

References

External links
 ATP – Tournament profile

Italian Open
Italian Open
Italian Open
Italian Open (tennis)
1984 in Italian tennis